Zatrephes crocos is a moth in the family Erebidae. It was described by Pieter Cramer in 1777. It is found in French Guiana, Suriname and Venezuela.

References

Phaegopterina
Moths described in 1777